Harrison Township is a township in Vernon County, in the U.S. state of Missouri.

Harrison Township was erected in 1842, taking its name from President William Henry Harrison.

References

Townships in Missouri
Townships in Vernon County, Missouri